The Bigelow Rosenwald School, also known as Rosenwald Community Center, is a former Rosenwald School located in Toad Suck, about  northeast of Bigelow, Perry County, Arkansas.  Built in 1926, it is a single-story wood-frame building with vernacular Craftsman elements.  It served as a school until 1964, when it became a community center. It is the only Rosenwald School building that still stands in Perry County.

The building was listed on the National Register of Historic Places in 2004.

See also
National Register of Historic Places listings in Perry County, Arkansas

References

External links

School buildings on the National Register of Historic Places in Arkansas
Rosenwald schools in Arkansas
Schools in Perry County, Arkansas
National Register of Historic Places in Perry County, Arkansas
1926 establishments in Arkansas
School buildings completed in 1926
Historically segregated African-American schools in Arkansas
Community centers in Arkansas